Doronicum pardaliances, known as leopard's-bane, is a species of flowering plant in the family Asteraceae. Like other members of the genus Doronicum, it is a rhizomatous herbaceous perennial. It is native to western Europe and was introduced to the British Isles, where it was first recorded in Northumberland in 1633.

References

Senecioneae
Flora of Europe
Taxa named by Carl Linnaeus